Ernane Rezende Borges Ferreira or simply Ernane (born February 22, 1985 in Governador Valadares), is a Brazilian left back. He currently plays for Democrata GV-MG on loan from Atlético Mineiro.

Contract
Democrata GV-MG (Loan) 16 May 2007 to 30 November 2007
Atlético Mineiro 15 May 2007 to 31 December 2007

External links
CBF
oesport

1985 births
Living people
Brazilian footballers
Esporte Clube Democrata players
Clube Atlético Mineiro players
People from Governador Valadares
Association football defenders
Sportspeople from Minas Gerais